Luc Courchesne  D.F.A. (1952) is a Canadian artist and academic known for his work in interactive art.

Life 
Luc Courchesne was born May 20, 1952, in Saint-Léonard-d'Aston, Quebec. He received a bachelor's degree in design from the Nova Scotia College of Art and Design in 1974. In the 1980s, he received a Master of Science degree in visual studies from the Massachusetts Institute of Technology. Courschene was a member of the MIT Media Lab at its inception in 1985.

Courschene was a professor of industrial design at the Université de Montréal.

Work
Courchesne is known for his interactive video installations and environments. He began working in interactive video in 1984 when he co-authored Elastic Movies, and since has produced many installation works and image series. In his early works such as Family Portrait and Portrait One (1989), the viewer interacts with the a human image programmed to engage in a lifelike conversation with the viewer. His later work Landscape One (1997) surrounds the viewer with a 360 degree immersive and interactive video projection of a park.

On September 11, 2001, while he was on assignment in New York City for a "Québec–New York" cultural event, Courchesne happened to be videotaping the smoldering North Tower of the World Trade Center as the second plane hit the South Tower. The 23-minute video of his experience on that fateful day was available at CBC/Radio-Canada archives .

In 1994, he exhibited his work in a solo show at the Museum of Modern Art in New York titled Project 47: Luc Courchesne. and has had numerous later solo and group shows, both nationally and internationally. In 2022, Luc Courchesne - Observateur du monde, an exhibition, was shown at the Carrefour des Arts, Université de Montréal. He is represented by gallery Pierre-François Ouellette art contemporain in Montreal. 

He has been awarded several artist-in-residence positions internationally. Since 1996, he has been a member of the Society for Arts and Technology in Montreal. He was Chairman of the Board of Directors from 1996 to 2005, then Vice-Chairman from 2005 to 2008.

Collections
Courchesne's work is included in the permanent collection of the National Gallery of Canada, Musée national des beaux-arts du Québecand elsewhere as well as in many institutions internationally such as the Zentrum für Kunst und Medientechnologie (ZKM) in Karlsruhe.

Awards
 1997 - his installation Paysage no. 1 won the Grand Prize of the first biennale of the NTT InterCommunication Center in Tokyo.
 1999 - honorary mention in the category of "Interactive Art" of the Prix Ars Electronica in Linz. 
 2010 - member of the RCA by way of their nomination process. 
 2019 - received the Prix Paul-Émile Borduas, Quebec's highest award in visual arts. 
 2021 - Governor General's Award in Visual and Media Arts. 
 2022 - awarded an honorary doctorate from NSCAD.

See also 
Digital art
Université de Montréal

References

External links 
 

1952 births
Artists from Montreal
Academic staff of the Université de Montréal
Canadian digital artists
NSCAD University alumni
Massachusetts Institute of Technology alumni
Living people
Members of the Royal Canadian Academy of Arts
Governor General's Award in Visual and Media Arts winners